Jack or Jackie Hamilton may refer to:
Jack Hamilton (sports executive) (1886–1976), Canadian sports executive
John Hamilton (gangster) or Jack Hamilton (1899–1934), Canadian murderer and bank-robber
Jackie Hamilton (ice hockey) (1925–1994), hockey player with the Toronto Maple Leafs
Jack Hamilton (footballer, born 1928) (1928–1990), Australian rules football player for Collingwood and administrator
Jack Hamilton (footballer, born 1937), Australian rules footballer for South Melbourne
Jackie Hamilton (1937–2003), English stand-up comedian
Jack Hamilton (baseball) (1938–2018), Major League Baseball pitcher
Jack Hamilton (footballer, born 1994), Scottish association football goalkeeper for Dundee
Jack Hamilton (footballer, born 2000), Scottish association football forward for Livingston

See also
"The Death of Jack Hamilton", a 2002 short story by Stephen King
John Hamilton (disambiguation)